Craig Seaplane Base  is a public use seaplane base owned by and located in Craig, a city in the Prince of Wales-Hyder Census Area of the U.S. state of Alaska.

As per Federal Aviation Administration records, the airport had 5,844 enplanements (passenger boardings) in calendar year 2008, 4,470 enplanements in 2009, and 4,368 in 2010. It is included in the National Plan of Integrated Airport Systems for 2011–2015, which categorized it as a non-primary commercial service airport (between 2,500 and 10,000 enplanements per year).

Facilities and aircraft 
Craig Seaplane Base has one seaplane landing area designated N/S with a water surface measuring 10,000 by 2,000 feet (3,048 x 610 m). For the 12-month period ending December 31, 2006, the airport had 2,254 aircraft operations, an average of 187 per month: 78% air taxi and 22% general aviation.

Airlines and destinations
The following airlines offer scheduled passenger service:

References

External links 
 Topographic map from USGS The National Map

Airports in the Prince of Wales–Hyder Census Area, Alaska
Seaplane bases in Alaska